Jack Gillmore Wiggins Jr. (born January 1, 1926) is an American psychologist and a past president of the American Psychological Association (APA).

Biography
Wiggins earned an undergraduate psychology degree from the University of Oklahoma in 1948. He completed a master's degree from Southern Methodist University and a Ph.D. from Purdue University.
 
Serving as the 1992 APA president, Wiggins was the second of five APA presidents elected between 1990 and 2000 who publicly advocated for prescriptive privileges for psychologists.

Wiggins is a board member emeritus of the Academy of Medical Psychology. He was editor of the Archives of Medical Psychology. In 2005, Wiggins was recognized by APA president Ronald F. Levant for his efforts in advocating for prescriptive privileges for psychologists. The next year, he was honored with a lifetime achievement award from the American Psychological Foundation.

References

1926 births
Living people
Presidents of the American Psychological Association
Purdue University College of Health and Human Sciences alumni
Southern Methodist University alumni
University of Oklahoma alumni